Cholesteryl benzoate, also called 5-cholesten-3-yl benzoate, is an organic chemical, an ester of cholesterol and benzoic acid. It is a liquid crystal material forming cholesteric liquid crystals with helical structure.

It can be used with cholesteryl nonanoate and cholesteryl oleyl carbonate in some thermochromic liquid crystals.

It is used in some hair colors, make-ups, and some other cosmetic preparations.

It can be also used as a component of the liquid crystals used for liquid crystal displays.

Cholesteryl benzoate was the first material in which liquid crystal properties were discovered. In the late 1880s Friedrich Reinitzer, an Austrian botanist, while studying the chemicals in plants, heated cholesteryl benzoate. At 145 °C the material melted, yielding a cloudy fluid, which changed to the originally expected clear liquid at 178.5 °C. In 1888, the German physicist Otto Lehmann concluded the cloudy fluid presents a new phase of matter, and coined the term liquid crystal.

References

Cholestanes
Liquid crystals
Benzoate esters